Ice IX is a form of solid water stable at temperatures below 140 K or -133.15 C and pressures between 200 and 400 MPa. It has a tetragonal crystal lattice and a density of 1.16 g/cm3, 26% higher than ordinary ice. It is formed by cooling ice III from 208 K to 165 K (rapidly—to avoid forming ice II). Its structure is identical to ice III other than being hydrogen-ordered.

Ordinary water ice is known as ice Ih in the Bridgman nomenclature. Different types of ice, from ice II to ice XIX, have been created in the laboratory at different temperatures and pressures.

See also
Ice, for other crystalline forms of ice.

References

 Bridgman, P. W. (1937) J. Chem. Phys. 5, 964.

External links
 London South Bank University Report

Water ice